Franz Kellinger (1 December 1905 – 14 June 1941) was an Austrian footballer. He played in one match for the Austria national football team in 1929.

Personal life
Kellinger served as a Soldat (private) in the German Army during the Second World War and died on active service on 14 June 1941. He is buried in Iași, Romania.

References

External links
 

1905 births
1941 deaths
Austrian footballers
Austria international footballers
Association footballers not categorized by position
Footballers from Vienna
German Army soldiers of World War II
German Army personnel killed in World War II
Burials in Romania